The Silver Lining is Soul Asylum's 9th studio album. It was released on July 11, 2006, eight years after Candy from a Stranger.

It is the last studio album with original bassist Karl Mueller, who died of cancer on June 17, 2005. Mueller was able to play on most of the tracks, while the band brought in Tommy Stinson for the remaining ones.

The single "Stand Up And Be Strong" was chosen by ABC and ESPN for their college football coverage for the 2006-2007 season.

Fellow Minneapolis musician Prince recorded a cover of "Stand Up And Be Strong" in 2010, and it was eventually released in his 2021 posthumous record Welcome 2 America.

Track listing
All songs written by Dave Pirner.
"Stand Up And Be Strong" - 4:22
"Lately" - 3:27
"Crazy Mixed Up World" - 3:55
"All Is Well" - 3:13
"Bus Named Desire" - 3:04
"Whatcha Need" - 3:50
"Standing Water" - 4:38
"Success Is Not So Sweet" - 4:56
"The Great Exaggerator" - 4:06
"Oxygen" - 4:01
"Good For You" - 3:52
"Slowly Rising" - 3:55"Fearless Leader" (hidden track) - 3:32

Singles

"All is Well"
"Stand Up and Be Strong"
"Standing Water"
"Good For You"

Charts

Band members
 Dave Pirner – lead vocals, rhythm guitar
 Dan Murphy – lead guitar, backing vocals
 Karl Mueller – bass
 Michael Bland – drums

Additional Personnel
 Tommy Stinson – bass
 John Fields - bass
 Jeff Victor - keyboards

References

Yahoo! News - ABC & ESPN Choose Soul Asylum's Single 'Stand Up And Be Strong' for Their College Football Coverage (Link dead as of 21:40, 14 January 2007 (UTC)

External links

Soul Asylum albums
2006 albums
Columbia Records albums